Stanislav Kolíbal (born 11 December 1925) is a Czech artist and sculptor.

Work
His work is counted among the fundamentals of modern Czech art. Since the 1950s, Stanislav Kolíbal has been one of the most notable personalities on the Czech art scene. He was a leading figure in the group “UB 12”, which played an important role in the 1960s. 
His language is geometry, his predominant theme the relation of illusion and reality. Eventually his emphasis turned to the need for finding rules and order. It is a meditation on the problems engendered by and linked to man's presence on Earth.

From drawings used as ground plans, Stavby (Buildings), i.e. wooden and metal objects, that became Kolíbal's preoccupation since the second half of the 1980s, came into being. Stanislav Kolíbal has been drawing and sculpting simultaneously with his work in architecture and other creative pursuits for more than 60 years. His cycles of drawings are a key to the understanding of his highly sophisticated art.

He has exhibited in numerous museums and important exhibitions: the 5th exhibition of "the Sculpture of Twenty Nations" at the Guggenheim in New York, "Paris Prague" at the Musée d'Art Moderne de la Ville de Paris, and "Painting and Sculpture Today" (1980) at the  Indianapolis Museum of Art.

External links
 Stanislav Kolíbal at MoMA
  Article about Kolíbal
Stanislav Kolibal celebrates his 80th birthday with a new exhibition. | Radio Prague
Stanislav Kolíbal Conctructions
TATE Collection Stanislav Kolíbal
Artist Stanislav Kolíbal ARTLIST-  database of contemporary Czech art

1925 births
Living people
People from Orlová
Czech male sculptors
20th-century Czech sculptors
20th-century male artists
21st-century Czech sculptors
Recipients of Medal of Merit (Czech Republic)
Academy of Arts, Architecture and Design in Prague alumni